Jana Novotná and Catherine Suire were the defending champions but did not compete that year.

Patty Fendick and Jill Hetherington won in the final 7–6, 6–4 against Betsy Nagelsen and Dianne van Rensburg.

Seeds
Champion seeds are indicated in bold text while text in italics indicates the round in which those seeds were eliminated.

 Betsy Nagelsen /  Dianne van Rensburg (final)
 Rosalyn Fairbank /  Gretchen Magers (semifinals)
 Jo Durie /  Sharon Walsh-Pete (semifinals)
 Patty Fendick /  Jill Hetherington (champions)

Draw

External links
 1988 Virginia Slims of San Diego Doubles draw

Southern California Open
1988 WTA Tour